"" (Lord Jesus Christ, you highest good) is the beginning of two Lutheran hymns. One is a penitential hymn, written in 1588 by Bartholomäus Ringwaldt, who possibly also created the melody. The other is an anonymous communion hymn, probably based on the former, which appeared first in 1713. Johann Sebastian Bach's used the penitential hymn several times, including the chorale cantata , based on the hymn.

History

Penitential hymn 
Bartholomäus Ringwaldt wrote the lyrics of the penitential hymn in 1588, and possibly also created the melody. He wrote eight stanzas, beginning "" (Lord Jesus Christ, you highest good, you fountain of all mercy).

Communion hymn 
An anonymous poet, who was probably inspired by Ringwaldt's song, wrote a communion hymn of three stanzas, beginning "" (Lord Jesus Christ, you highest good, who invited us), taking not only the first line, but also the rhyme of the second from Ringwaldt's hymn. Its theology follows writing by Johann Arndt, who had written in Sechs Bücher vom wahren Christentum that God is good and the highest good, which can be tasted in his sacrament. The song appeared first in Chemnitz in 1713 in the hymnal Vollständiges Chemnitzer Gesangbuch. The melody refers to Ringwaldt's song.

This hymn is part of the Protestant hymnal Evangelisches Gesangbuch as EG 219.

Musical settings 
Alternative melodies for both songs are the one of "Aus tiefer Not schrei ich zu dir" and others during the 17th and 18th century.

Based on Zahn 4486, "Wenn mein Stündlein vorhanden ist"
Bach used several stanzas of the penitential hymn. His settings are based on the Zahn No. 4486 hymn tune, that is one of the melodies composed for "Wenn mein Stündlein vorhanden ist". , one of his early cantatas is a setting of Psalm 130, containing two stanzas of the hymn which are juxtaposed in the manner of a chorale fantasia with an aria. The chorale cantata was first performed on 24 August 1724, the eleventh Sunday after Trinity that year. Bach composed a chorale prelude, BWV 1114, which became part of the Neumeister Chorales, rediscovered in 1985 by Christoph Wolff.

References

External links 
 Chorale sonata on "Lord Jesus Christ, you highest good" Schott
 Das I. Register Geist-reiches Gesang-Buch
 Alphabetisches Gesamtregister zu den ausgewerteten Quellen Index of songs by Johann Crüger
 BWV 113.8 bach-chorales.com
 Neumeister Chorales musicaneo.com

16th-century hymns in German
Lutheran hymns
Hymn tunes